Lyndie Greenwood (born June 6, 1983) is a Canadian actress best known for her recurring role of Sonya on The CW's Nikita and being a series regular cast member of FOX's Sleepy Hollow, playing the role of Jenny Mills in 2013. In 2019, she joined the cast of the Amazon Prime Video series The Expanse in the recurring role of Dr. Elvi Okoye.

Career
Born and raised in Toronto, Greenwood studied dance in school and is also well-versed in martial arts. She attended several voice and musical theater schools in Canada. She began acting training at multiple schools including the Professional Actors Lab, Jason Fraser Studios, Etobicoke School of the Arts and also at University Settlement Drama Group. She attained a Bachelor of Science degree from the University of Toronto in 2006. Her first role onscreen was in a low-budget Canadian movie Pinkville. She made her television debut on an episode of The Listener. She made many guest appearances on television such as Rookie Blue, Flashpoint, Being Erica, Covert Affairs, Lost Girl and Saving Hope. She has also appeared in minor roles in short-form movies such as Little Phoenix and the Fists of Fury and as Jenn in The Exit, which she claims was her favourite role. She was also cast in This Movie Is Broken. Her career took off in 2011 when she was cast in a recurring role as Sonya on The CW's popular Nikita series. After the success of season 2 of Nikita, she was retained for seasons 3 and 4. In August 2013, she was cast in a recurring role on FOX's Sleepy Hollow. In January 2014, she was promoted to series regular for season 2. In 2019, she was cast in a recurring role as Dr. Elvi Okoye, a biologist working for the Royal Charter Energy (RCE), on the science fiction Amazon Prime Video series The Expanse.

Filmography

Film

Television

References

External links

1983 births
Living people
21st-century Canadian actresses
Actresses from Toronto
Black Canadian actresses
Canadian film actresses
Canadian television actresses
University of Toronto alumni